The Miners Welfare Ground is a cricket ground in Blackwell, England that Derbyshire CCC used between 1909 and 1913.

The ground hosted 7 first-class matches.

Game Information:
{| class="wikitable"
|-
! Game Type
! No. of Games
|-
| County Championship Matches
| 7
|-
| limited-over county matches
| 0
|-
| Twenty20 matches
|}

Game Statistics: first-class:
{| class="wikitable"
|-
! Category
! Information
|-
| Highest Team Score
| Warwickshire (504/7dec against Derbyshire) in 1910
|-
| Lowest Team Score
| Derbyshire (124 against Nottinghamshire) in 1912
|-
| Best Batting Performance
| Crowther Charlesworth (216 runs for Warwickshire against Derbyshire in 1910
|-
| Best Bowling Performance
| Thomas Wass (9/67 for Nottinghamshire against Derbyshire) in 1911
|}

External links
 Cricinfo Website - Ground Page
 Cricket Archive page

Cricket grounds in Derbyshire
Sports venues completed in 1909